Gilmar Lima Sacramento Eusébio (born 3 March 1995), known as Gilmar Tavinho, is a Santomean footballer who plays as a goalkeeper for Trindade and the São Tomé and Príncipe national team.

International career
Trauré made his professional debut with the São Tomé and Príncipe national team in a 4–0 2021 Africa Cup of Nations qualification loss to Sudan on 13 November 2019.

References

External links
 
 
 

1995 births
Living people
São Tomé and Príncipe footballers
São Tomé and Príncipe international footballers
Association football goalkeepers
Sporting Praia Cruz players